Brahmapurisvarar Temple, Esanur, is a Siva temple in Melai Esanur, next to Keezhaiyur in Nagapattinam-Thiruthuraipoondi road in Nagapattinam District in Tamil Nadu (India).

Vaippu Sthalam
It is one of the shrines of the Vaippu Sthalams sung by Tamil Saivite Nayanar Sundarar.

Presiding deity
The presiding deity is known as Brahmapurisvarar. His consort is known as Sugantha Kunthalambigai.

Shrines

The temple is in a small structure. The shrine of goddess is found next to presiding deity.

References

External links
 மூவர் தேவார வைப்புத்தலங்கள், IcanUr, Sl.No.38 of 139 temples
 Shiva Temples, தேவார வைப்புத்தலங்கள், ஈசனூர், Sl.No.21 of 133 temples, page1

Hindu temples in Nagapattinam district